Tomb TT407, located in the necropolis of El-Assasif in Thebes, Egypt, is the tomb of Bintenduanetjer, who was the Chamberlain of the Divine Adoratrice, and dates to the Saite period. 

The tomb is located off the south side of the first columned hall of Kheruef's tomb (TT192), which dates to the Eighteenth Dynasty of Egypt.

See also
 List of Theban tombs

References

Theban tombs